The Nelories were an independent Japanese alternative pop duo, active in the 1990s. The band consisted of Jun Kurihara on accordion and Kazmi Kubo on guitars.  Their recordings were only released in Japan and England, with the exception of one EP released through John Flansburgh and Marjorie Galen's subscription-based Hello CD of the Month Club.

History
The Nelories formed while Kurihara and Kubo were in high school. Around this time, Kurihara also befriended Akiko of Sugarfrost Records, which would be responsible for releasing Nelories material in England.  Kurihara and Kubo would sometimes refer to themselves as Jun and Kazmi "de Nelorie" ("of the Nelories"), in the spirit of the fraternal ties between the Ramones. Their first album, Mellow Yellow Fellow Nelories, was released while the duo was in college, and received praise in Japan.

Kurihara wrote all her lyrics in English, despite the fact that it was not her first language.

Both Kurihara and Kubo have continued their careers in music following the Nelories' disband. Kurihara was also involved with a band called The Music Lovers in the mid-2000s.

Discography
Over the course of their career, the Nelories released three full studio albums, six extended plays, and one single.

Albums 
Mellow Yellow Fellow Nelories (1992)
Label: ¡Por supuesto! (Japan)
Track listing:
Waiting
Banana 
Plastic Sky 
No Love Lost 
Go Go Merry-Go-Round 
Neutral Blue
Bubbly 
Emerald 
Trampoline
JPG 

Daisy (1993)
Label: Suite supuesto (Japan)
Track listing:
Daydreamers
Set Pure Ven
Desperate
A Girl in a Checkered Dress
Ringhanger
Indie Pop Car Baby
You Saved Me
Un Revolver A Six Coups
Garlic
Fireblade Sky
Daisy
Eyes & Shoes
Garlic

Starboogie (1994)
Label: Suite supuesto (Japan)
Track listing:
Too Late Or Not Too Late
Popstars
Starboogie
So Anyway I Sing
I Like Your Hair
White Volkswagen
Service Area
Blue Flower
The Shooting Pictures
Don't Make Any Promise
Roseland

EPs 
Plasticky (1991)
Label: ¡Por supuesto! (Japan) 
Track listing:
The Chestnutfield Family
Keith
Plasticky
Cadillac For Montevideo

Banana (1992)
Label: Sugarfrost Records [FROSTY 04] (England); ¡Por supuesto! (Japan)
Track listing:
Banana
Emerald
Trampolene
Run Free [Japanese release]

Nelories (1993)
Label: Hello Recording Club [hel-34] (US)
Track listing:
Waiting
Banana
Bubbly
Plastic Sky

Indie Pop Car Baby (1993)
Label: Suite supuesto (Japan)
Track listing:
Indie Pop Car Baby
Your Smile
Hell Toupee
An Ordinary Miracle
Indie Pop Car Baby (demo)

Popstars (1994) 
Label: Suite supuesto (Japan)
Track listing:
Popstars
For A Friend
La Cerveza

An Ordinary Miracle (1995) 
Label: Suite supuesto (Japan)
Track listing:
An Ordinary Miracle (live)
An Ordinary Miracle (Pimlico mix)
Run Free (The Peel Sessions)
Garlic (The Peel Sessions)

Singles 
"Eyes And Shoes" (1994)
Label: Sugarfrost Records (England) 
B-side: Fireblade Skies

References

Japanese rock music groups